Lane Dominick Taylor (born November 22, 1989) is an American football guard who is a free agent. He played college football at Oklahoma State. Taylor was signed by the Green Bay Packers as an undrafted free agent in 2013.

Professional career

Green Bay Packers

After going undrafted in the 2013 NFL Draft, Taylor signed with the Green Bay Packers on May 10, 2013. In his rookie season, he appeared in ten games, playing predominantly on special teams.

Taylor appeared in all 16 games in his second season in 2014, playing at left and right guard.

In his third season in 2015, Taylor started the first NFL game of his career against the Detroit Lions in Week 13 at right guard. He started his second game against the Minnesota Vikings at left guard in Week 17. ESPN staff writer Rob Demovsky cited that Taylor performed "nearly flawlessly" in both games.

On March 8, 2016, Taylor signed a two-year, $4.15 million contract with the Packers.

On September 4, 2017, Taylor signed a three-year, $16.5 million contract extension with the Packers after starting all 16 games for the first time in 2016.

On September 21, 2019, Taylor was placed on injured reserve with a biceps injury.

Taylor entered the 2020 season as the Packers starting right guard. He suffered a season-ending knee injury in Week 1. On September 22, Taylor was placed on injured reserve.

Houston Texans
On April 16, 2021, Taylor signed with Houston Texans to a one-year contract. He was released on August 31, 2021 and re-signed to the practice squad. He was promoted to the active roster on November 27.

References

External links

Green Bay Packers bio

1989 births
Living people
Players of American football from Texas
Sportspeople from Arlington, Texas
American football offensive guards
Oklahoma State Cowboys football players
Green Bay Packers players
Houston Texans players